Miss Nicaragua International is an annual beauty pageant in Nicaragua, that selects the Nicaraguan representatives for Miss International every year.

The current Miss Nicaragua International 2022 is Fernanda Salazar from the department of Managua. She will represent Nicaragua in Miss International 2022 in Yokohama, Japan.

History 
The pageant began in the 60's when the clubs in the own Managua, Club de Leones, Club 20-30 started the pageant with ladies from across the country.

In 2001, the Miss Nicaragua Organization, selects the Nicaraguan representatives at Miss International selecting between the finalists in the final top.

Began 2018 the Miss Nicaragua Organization, loose the franchise against the financial problems in the Miss Nicaragua pageant. The current organization of Miss Mundo Nicaragua by Denis Dávila that selects the Nicaraguan representatives in Miss International.

Titleholders

International Representatives

Regional rankings

References

Beauty pageants in Nicaragua